= Union War Book =

Document outlining response of India in war

The Union War Book of India is a document outlining the response and functions of the Government of India during war. The States of India also have their State War Books.
